Pittsfield Penstone Municipal Airport is a public-use civil airport in Pittsfield, Pike County, Illinois, United States. It is owned by the City of Pittsfield and is located between the Mississippi and Illinois Rivers. The airport is classified as a general aviation facility by the Federal Aviation Administration.

Wildlife has been known to live on and around the airport, and trophy hunting has proved a major use of the airport.

For the yearlong period ending April 30, 2021, the airport had 134 aircraft operations per week, totaling nearly 7,000 per year: 67% local general aviation, 29% transient general aviation, 3% air taxi, and 1% military. The airport has no major commercial service. In this time period there were 10 aircraft based on the field: 7 single engine, 2 multi-engine, and 1 jet.

The airport has one runway: 13/31 is 4000 feet x 60 feet and is made of asphalt. The airport is at an elevation of 710 feet and covers 300 acres.

References 

Airports in Illinois
Civil aviation in the United States